Sally Rutherford (born 5 June 1981) is a New Zealand field hockey player. She has competed for the New Zealand women's national field hockey team (the Black Sticks Women) since 2009. She was the reserve goalkeeper for the team during the 2012 Summer Olympics.

References

External links
 

1981 births
Living people
New Zealand female field hockey players
Field hockey players at the 2014 Commonwealth Games
Commonwealth Games bronze medallists for New Zealand
Field hockey players at the 2016 Summer Olympics
Olympic field hockey players of New Zealand
Sportspeople from Hamilton, New Zealand
Commonwealth Games medallists in field hockey
Female field hockey goalkeepers
Commonwealth Games gold medallists for New Zealand
Field hockey players at the 2018 Commonwealth Games
20th-century New Zealand women
21st-century New Zealand women
Medallists at the 2014 Commonwealth Games
Medallists at the 2018 Commonwealth Games